The Rogers Milk Plant Building is a historic commercial building at 216 West Birch in Rogers, Arkansas.  It is an industrial three-story building, built out of concrete and steel.  The floors are stepped, decreasing in size at each level.  The exterior is painted concrete, with regularly spaced sash windows separated by pilaster-like projections.  A metal-sided warehouse was appended to the building at a later date.  The main structure was built in 1928, and was operated first by Barnes Dairy Products and then by the Carnation Company.  In the 1960s it was taken over by a seed company business, which operated on the site until 2006.

The building was listed on the National Register of Historic Places in 2019.

See also
National Register of Historic Places listings in Benton County, Arkansas

References

Commercial buildings on the National Register of Historic Places in Arkansas
Buildings and structures completed in 1928
Buildings and structures in Rogers, Arkansas
1928 establishments in Arkansas
National Register of Historic Places in Benton County, Arkansas